Richard Todd (1919–2009) was an Irish-born British stage and film actor.

Richard Todd may also refer to:

Richard D. Todd (1951–2008), American psychiatrist
Richard Todd (American football) (born 1953), former American football quarterback
Richard Todd (horn player), American horn player
Richard Copeland Todd, pioneer from Chester, South Carolina

See also
Dick Todd (disambiguation)